Gabriel Makhlouf is a British policymaker who has served as the Governor of the Central Bank of Ireland since September 2019. He was previously Secretary to the New Zealand Treasury and Private Secretary to then British Chancellor of the Exchequer, Gordon Brown.

He was appointed to the Central Bank after an open international competition led to him being the only name put forward to the Government of Ireland for appointment. However, his appointment has not been uncontroversial due to an incident in New Zealand when he claimed the disclosure of sensitive information was the result of a deliberate hack, when the information had actually been disclosed accidentally. In July 2019, The Irish Times reported that the European Central Bank had raised concerns with the Irish government about Makhlouf. These reportedly included that he was not an economist and that he is a British citizen.

Gabriel Makhlouf was born in Egypt to a Cypriot-British father and Greek-Armenian mother.

Notes

Governors of the Central Bank of Ireland
1960 births
Living people
British civil servants
British expatriates in New Zealand